The 2nd Mounted Division was a yeomanry (Territorial Army cavalry) division that served in the First World War.  At the outbreak of war it was assigned to defence of the Norfolk coast. In March 1915 it formed a 2nd Line duplicate of itself, the 2/2nd Mounted Division. Leaving the 2/2nd on coastal defence, it then fought at Gallipoli from April to December 1915, under the command of Major General William Peyton, before being disbanded in January 1916.

A different 2nd Mounted Division, was formed in Egypt in 1918 from the Indian elements of the 5th Cavalry Division in France, but then renumbered as the 5th Cavalry Division, served in Palestine and was a part of the Palestine Occupation Force.

History

Formation
A decision was made to form a new mounted division from the mounted brigades in and around the Churn area of Berkshire.  On 2 September 1914, 2nd Mounted Division, with Headquarters at Goring, came into being with three mounted brigades transferred from 1st Mounted Division (1st South Midland Mounted Brigade at Newbury, 2nd South Midland Mounted Brigade at Churn and the Nottinghamshire and Derbyshire Mounted Brigade at South Stoke) and the London Mounted Brigade at Streatley.  The brigades were relatively widely dispersed to allow an adequate water supply for the horses and to provide sufficient training areas.

In November 1914, the division moved to Norfolk on coastal defence duties.  Headquarters was established at Hanworth and the mounted brigades were at King's Lynn (1st South Midland), Fakenham (2nd South Midland), Holt (Notts. and Derby.) and Hanworth (London).

Egypt
In March 1915, the division was put on warning for overseas service.  In early April, the division starting leaving Avonmouth and the last elements landed at Alexandria before the end of the month.  By the middle of May, the Divisional Headquarters, the 2nd South Midland Mounted Brigade and Notts. and Derby. Mounted Brigade were at Cairo, the 1st South Midland Mounted Brigade was at Alexandria, and the London Mounted Brigade and the horse artillery batteries were near Ismaïlia on Suez Canal defences.  The mounted brigades were numbered at this time.

On 10 August 1915, the division was reorganized as a dismounted formation in preparation for service at Gallipoli.  Each Yeomanry Regiment left a squadron headquarters and two troops (about 100 officers and men) in Egypt to look after the horses.  The artillery batteries and ammunition columns, signal troops, mobile veterinary sections, Mounted Brigade Transport and Supply Columns and two of the Field Ambulances were also left behind in Egypt.  The Yeomanry Mounted Brigade, which was formed in Egypt in January 1915, was likewise dismounted and joined the division on 13 August as a fifth brigade.  The division entrained for Alexandria on 13 August, sailed the next day and reached Mudros on 17 August.  It landed at Suvla Bay that night.

Gallipoli
The division landed at "A" Beach, Suvla Bay on the night of 17 August / morning of 18 August and moved into reserve positions at Lala Baba on the night of 20 August. On 21 August it advanced to Chocolate Hill under heavy fire and took part in the attack on Hill 112.

Due to losses during the Battle of Scimitar Hill and wastage during August 1915, the division had to be reorganised. On 4 September 1915, the 1st Composite Mounted Brigade was formed from the 1st, 2nd and 5th Mounted Brigades, and the 2nd Composite Mounted Brigade from the 3rd and 4th Mounted Brigades.  Each dismounted brigade formed a battalion sized unit, for example, 1st South Midland Regiment (Warwickshire, Gloucestershire and Worcestershire Yeomanry).

The Scottish Horse Mounted Brigade landed as Suvla on 2 September and joined the division.  Likewise, the Highland Mounted Brigade joined the division after landing on 26 September.  Both brigades were dismounted in the UK before sailing directly for Gallipoli.

Return to Egypt
The division returned to Egypt from Gallipoli in December 1915 and was reformed and remounted.  The artillery batteries and other units left in Egypt rejoined the division between 10 and 20 December 1915.  However, the dismemberment of the division began almost immediately as units were posted to the Western Frontier Force or to various other commands.

1st South Midland Mounted Brigade left the division on 3 and 4 January 1916 for Es Salhia.  The brigade served as Corps Troops in Egypt from 21 January 1916.  On 31 March 1916, the remaining Mounted Brigades were numbered in a single sequence.  As a consequence, the 1st South Midland Mounted Brigade was redesignated as 5th Mounted Brigade on 20 April.  It joined the Imperial Mounted Division in January 1917.
2nd South Midland Mounted Brigade left the division on 17 January 1916 and was sent to the Western Frontier of Egypt as an independent formation.  It was redesignated as 6th Mounted Brigade in April 1916.  It served with the Western Frontier Force from January to October 1916 and also joined the Imperial Mounted Division in January 1917.
Nottinghamshire and Derbyshire Mounted Brigade left the division on 18 and 19 January 1916.  In February 1916 the brigade was sent to take part in the Salonika Campaign. It was redesignated as 7th Mounted Brigade and returned to Egypt in June 1917.
London Mounted Brigade left the division on 18 January 1916 and was sent to Abbassia.  It served as part of the Suez Canal Defences.  It was redesignated as 8th Mounted Brigade.  From November 1916 to June 1917 it also served at Salonika before returning to Egypt in June 1917.  The brigade joined the newly formed Yeomanry Mounted Division on 21 July 1917 at el Fuqari.
Yeomanry Mounted Brigade left the 2nd Mounted Division on 7 December 1915, was reformed and remounted, and joined the Western Frontier Force.  By March 1916, the brigade had been broken up.
On 21 January 1916, 2nd Mounted Division was disbanded.

Commanders
The 2nd Mounted Division had the following commanders:

See also

 List of British divisions in World War I
 British yeomanry during the First World War

Notes

References

Bibliography

External links
2nd Mounted Division on The Long, Long Trail
2nd Mounted Division on the Regimental Warpath

2
2
Military units and formations established in 1914
Military units and formations disestablished in 1916
1914 establishments in the United Kingdom